Azad Beg (born July 4, 1952) was the founder of the Turkic nationalist Ittehadiya Islami-ye Wilayat-i Shamal movement in Afghanistan during the Soviet-Afghan War. Beg was the great-grandson of Nasseruddin, the last amir of Kokand.

Azad Beg was born in Campbellpur, Pakistan. His father, Abdul Waris Karimi, was an Uzbek doctor serving in the Pakistan Army. Azad Beg's mother was the daughter of Mehmood Beg, the grandson of Syed Mohammad Khudayar, the Khan of Kokand.

References

 

1952 births
Living people
Mujahideen members of the Soviet–Afghan War
Nationalists of Asian nations
Afghan Uzbek politicians